The Powelton, also known as the Powelton Apartments, is a historic apartment complex located in the Powelton Village neighborhood of Philadelphia, Pennsylvania. It was built in two phases; in 1902 and 1910.  The first section was designed by architect Willis G. Hale (1848-1907) as a set of ten houses massed as six units.  It was converted to apartments by Milligan & Webber in 1910.

It was added to the National Register of Historic Places in 1978.

References

Residential buildings on the National Register of Historic Places in Philadelphia
Residential buildings completed in 1910
Powelton Village, Philadelphia